J-John Kavelaars, better known as JJ Kavelaars (born 1966), is a Canadian astronomer who was part of a team that discovered several moons of Jupiter, Saturn, Uranus, and Neptune. He is also a discoverer of minor planets and an investigator on the extended New Horizons mission, having aided in the discovery of 486958 Arrokoth.

Biography 
Kavelaars is a graduate of the Glencoe District High School in Glencoe, Ontario, the University of Guelph, and Queen's University, Kingston, Ontario.  He is currently an astronomer at the Dominion Astrophysical Observatory in Victoria, B.C.

In the course of his work, he has been responsible for the discovery of eleven satellites (moons) of Saturn, eight of Uranus, and four of Neptune, and a hundred or so minor planets. Kavelaars is the Coordinator of the Canada–France Ecliptic Plane Survey which is part of the Canada-France-Hawaii Telescope Legacy Survey "CFHTLS": a project dedicated to the discovery and tracking of objects in the outer Solar System.

Family 

He is the brother of Canadian actress Ingrid Kavelaars and Canadian fencing athlete Monique Kavelaars.

Honors 

The asteroid 154660 Kavelaars was named in his honor on 1 June 2007 by his colleague David D. Balam.

In 2022 Kavelaars was awarded the Canadian Astronomical Society Dunlap Award for Innovation in Astronomical Instrumentation and Software.  This award recognized Kavelaars' contributions to the development and leadership of the Canadian Astronomy Data Centre, in particular the development of cloud-based astronomical data analysis using the CANFAR Science Platform.

In 2022 Kavelaars was awarded the National Research Council Dan Wayner award for outstanding achievement in Science and Technology. This award was presented in recognition of Kavelaars' co-discovery of 486958 Arrokoth and contributions to the NASA's New Horizons encounter with that objet.

List of discovered minor planets

References

External links 
 Astronomy – John J. Kavelaars, Notable GDHS Graduates
 Homepage at NRC

1966 births
21st-century Canadian astronomers
Canadian people of Swedish descent

Discoverers of trans-Neptunian objects
Discoverers of moons
Living people
Planetary scientists
People from Middlesex County, Ontario